Arent Izak van Soelen (July 1898 – c. 1981) was a sailor from South Africa, who represented his country at the 1932 Summer Olympics in Los Angeles, United States.

Sources
 

1898 births
Year of death unknown
South African male sailors (sport)
Sailors at the 1932 Summer Olympics – Star
Olympic sailors of South Africa